The men's freestyle 57 kg is a competition featured at the 2017 Russian National Freestyle Wrestling Championships, and was held in Nazran, Ingushetia, Russia on June 13.

Medalists

Results
Legend
F — Won by fall
WO — Won by walkover (bye)

Finals

Top half

Section 1

Section 2

Repechage

References
https://pp.userapi.com/c841336/v841336800/68/4YgPChQ_YJw.jpg

Men's freestyle 57 kg